Andorra Club de Fútbol is a Spanish football team based in Andorra, Teruel, in the autonomous community of Aragon. Founded in 1957, it plays in Segunda División, holding home games at Estadio Juan Antonio Endeiza, with a capacity of 3,000 seats.

History

Club names
Calvo Sotelo Andorra – (1957–73)
Endesa Andorra – (1973–2001)
Andorra CF – (2001–)

Season to season

14 seasons in Segunda División B
43 seasons in Tercera División

Honours

 Tercera División

Winners (7): 1963–64, 1964–65, 1986–87, 1991–92, 1994–95, 1998–99, 2010–11
 Runners-up (4): 1965–66, 1980–81, 2012–13, 2015–16

Famous players
 Alberto Belsué
 Jesús Seba
 Txiki
 Goran Drulić

External links
Official website 
Futbolme team profile 
Estadios de España 

Football clubs in Aragon
Association football clubs established in 1957
Endesa
1957 establishments in Spain